Euhybus is a genus of hybotid dance flies in the family Hybotidae. There are at least 60 described species in Euhybus.

Species
These 63 species belong to the genus Euhybus:

References

Further reading

External links

 

Hybotidae
Taxa named by Daniel William Coquillett
Empidoidea genera